"Ride on Time" is MAX's 10th single released under Avex Trax. The title track and its b-side were used as the opening and ending theme songs to the drama "Sweet Devil" which starred the members of MAX as a group of college women who become cursed after using forbidden magic after getting involved in the case of a serial killer. The single debuted in the top 5 of the Oricon chart upon release and is the group's third best selling single.

Track list

Charts 
Oricon Sales Chart (Japan)

References 

MAX (band) songs
1998 singles
Japanese television drama theme songs
Songs with lyrics by Gorō Matsui
Song recordings produced by Max Matsuura